Federal Highway 113 (Carretera Federal 113) is a Federal Highway of Mexico. The highway travels from Mexico City in the north to Oaxtepec, Morelos in the south.

References

113